The Endeavour Yacht Corporation was an American boat builder based in Largo, Florida. Founded in 1974 by John Brooks and Rob Valdes, the company specialized in the design and manufacture of fiberglass sailboats. The company went out of business in 1986.

History

Brooks and Valdes had met while working for Vince Lazzara at Gulfstar Yachts. To assist the fledgling company get started in the boat building business, Ted Irwin of Irwin Yachts gave them the molds for the 1970 Irwin 32 in exchange for a small number of shares. The molds were modified by Dennis Robbins, who was responsible for Endeavour's production and design work. The reworked design was called the Endeavour 32 and about 600 examples were produced, starting in 1975, giving the company an early market success.

For a second design Brooks and Valdes located an abandoned Ray Creekmore designed  boat on the Miami River. It was also modified by Robbins, by adding  to the middle of the boat and it became the basis for the 1977 Endeavour 37, which was produced in sloop, cutter and yawl configurations. The company sold 476 examples of that design. The larger Endeavour 43 followed in 1979. These three designs were all optimized for sailing in the waters of the Florida Keys and the Bahama Islands and emphasized shoal drafts over good windward performance. Construction was all of fiberglass woven roving and multi-directional chopped strand fiber (MCSF), with polyester resin and plywood for cores. Robbins left the company to work for Irwin Yachts and Bob Johnson became the main designer for the next few years.

Starting in 1980 the emphasis shifted to improving sailing performance along with new construction materials and techniques. The 1981 Endeavour 40 was designed for the owner cruising market but also with an eye to establishing sales in the yacht charter market. This drove designs that were faster and also more comfortable.

America's Cup designer Johan Valentijn designed the Endeavour 38 in 1984 and Bruce Kelly drew the Endeavour 33 and 35 designs that same year. Construction moved to Klegecell, a closed-cell type of polyvinyl foam core, with multi-axial steel reinforced grids to improve hull stiffness. Valentijn went on to design the Endeavour 42 and 51 and by 1985 the company was producing center-cockpit boats for cruising and charter use. Construction was changed using end-grain balsa wood in the hulls above the waterline areas and plywood for more stressed parts of the boats, with polyurethane foam and triaxial fiberglass.

By 1984 the company had 300 employees and was building 200 boats per year. Due to the effects of the early 1980s recession Brooks closed the company and it entered bankruptcy. It was sold to the Denver-based Coastal Financial Corporation, headed by Troy Rollins. Brooks became the sales manager and Doug Franzese, who had been Production Manager at Gulfstar, became the company General Manager. Coastal Financial reopened production, but by 1988 were operating with only 105 employees and producing 50 boats per year, due to declining sales and competition with the used boat market.

The company was again closed in 1988 and sold to a Charleston, South Carolina investment company who re-opened it, but went out of business that same year. The company was sold again by Coastal Financial in 1991. After passing through several owners it became the Endeavour Catamaran Corporation. , that company produces catamaran motorboats at a new plant location in Clearwater, Florida. At one time they produced sailing catamarans and even produced some of the former Endeavour monohull designs on a custom basis, including the Endeavour 42, Endeavour 45 and Endeavour 52 as late as 1992, but this business seems to have been ended before 2000.

Original founder John Brooks was killed at his home in St Petersburg, Florida on 24 April 1996 in an apparent robbery attempt. He was 61 years old.

Boats 
Summary of boats built by Endeavour:

Lancer 25 - 1975
Endeavour 32 - 1976
Endeavour 32 CB - 1976
Endeavour 37 - 1977
Endeavour 43 - 1979
Endeavour 40 - 1981
Endeavour 33 - 1983
Endeavour 35 - 1983
Endeavour 38 - 1984
Endeavour 38 CC - 1984
CSY 51 - 1985
Endeavour 42 - 1985
Endeavour 51 -	1985
Endeavour 52 -	1989
Endeavour 54 -	1990
Intercat 1500 -	1990
Endeavourcat 30 - 1992
Manta 40 -	1994

See also
List of sailboat designers and manufacturers

References

External links

Endeavour Yacht Corporation